The Confederation of Labour of Kazakhstan (CLK) is a trade union center in Kazakhstan. It was founded March 2, 2004.

References

Trade unions in Kazakhstan
Trade unions established in 2004